Prateek Reddy (born 28 November 2000) is an Indian cricketer. He made his first-class debut on 12 February 2020, for Hyderabad in the 2019–20 Ranji Trophy. He made his List A debut on 20 February 2021, for Hyderabad in the 2020–21 Vijay Hazare Trophy.

References

External links
 

Living people
Indian cricketers
Hyderabad cricketers
Place of birth missing (living people)
2000 births